Pehr Gustaf Holmes  (April 9, 1881 – December 19, 1952) was a United States representative from Massachusetts.

Early life
Holmes was born in Mölnbacka in Forshaga Municipality in Värmland, Sweden. In 1886, when he was 4 years old, Holmes immigrated to the United States with his parents, who settled in Worcester, Massachusetts.

Education
Holmes attended the Millbury Street School public school until he was 14.

Business career
When he turned 14 Holmes left school and went to work for the Reed and Prince Manufacturing Co. of Worcester where he "tended machines".  Holmes also worked at the Brunell Electroplating plant, where he learned the business of Electroplating. In 1909 Holmes established his own Electroplating firm, the Holmes Electrotype Foundry.

Holmes also engaged in the banking and insurance business.

Public service

Worcester Common Council and Board of Aldermen
Holmes was elected member of the Worcester Common Council from Ward 6. In 1913 Holmes became a member of the Worcester Board of Aldermen,  serving as its president.

Mayor of Worcester
Holmes was inaugurated mayor of  Worcester on January 1, 1917, he served as mayor until January 5, 1920.

Massachusetts Governor's Council
Holmes served as a member of the Massachusetts Executive Council, Seventh Councilor district from 1925  to 1928.

United States House of Representatives
Holmes was elected as a Republican to the 72nd United States Congress and to the seven succeeding Congresses from (March 4, 1931 – January 3, 1947). Holmes was an unsuccessful candidate for reelection in 1946 to the 80th United States Congress.

Holmes returned to Worcester and his electrotype business. Holmes died in Venice, Florida; his interment was in the Old Swedish Cemetery in Worcester.

Sources
 
Members of the House who were born in foreign countries

Related reading
Swedes of Greater Worcester Revisited (by Eric J. Salomonsson, William O. Hultgren, and Philip C. Becker.  Arcadia Publishing.  2005)

Notes

1881 births
1952 deaths
People from Forshaga Municipality
Swedish emigrants to the United States
Massachusetts city council members
Mayors of Worcester, Massachusetts
Members of the Massachusetts Governor's Council
Republican Party members of the United States House of Representatives from Massachusetts
20th-century American politicians